The Vyshhorodsko–Darnytska line is a proposed sixth line to the Kyiv Metro system serving the Ukrainian capital Kyiv. The line is proposed to begin near the Taras Shevchenko Square in the city's north, and is to run south, connecting to the system's four other lines (one of which is currently under construction). It will later run east, and will cross over the Dnipro River and ending at the Darnytsia Railway Station on the city's left bank.

Planning
Talks about the creation of the Vyshhorodsko–Darnytska line as the fifth line addition to the Kyiv Metro first began in March 2012. The master plan also anticipates the construction of seven new depots, and two new subway lines, including the Vyshhorodsko–Darnytska line and the already under construction Podilsko–Vyhurivska line, with the priority for construction resting on the latter.

In 2013, it became known that the Vyshhorodsko–Darnytska line will be colored yellow on the future metro maps, and will perspectively connect the Minskyi neighborhood, Vitriani Hory, Priorka, Kurenivka, Karavaievy Dachi, Chokolivka, Oleksandrivska Slobidka, and Pozniaky neighborhoods of the city.

Prospective stations

The Vyshhorodsko–Darnytska line's perspective stations will be (listed west to east):

 Kiltseva Doroha
 Priorka
 Vyshhorodska
 Olena Teliha Street
 Dorohozhychi
 Shuliavska
 Prospekt Kosmonavta Komarova
 Karavaievi Dachi
 Chokolivsksa
 Prospekt Valeriya Lobanovskoho
 Volodymyra Brozhka Street
 Hrinchenka
 Lybidska
 Druzhby Narodiv
 Siti-Centr
 Rusanivka Naberezhna
 Kyivska Rusanivka
 Darntyskyi Vokzal

See also
 Livoberezhna line, another proposed fifth line addition to the Kyiv Metro

References

Kyiv Metro lines
Proposed public transport in Ukraine